The list of phishing incidents covers important or noteworthy events in the history of phishing.

1980s
 1987
 A phishing technique was described in detail in a paper and presentation delivered to the 1987 International HP Users Group, Interex.

1990s
The term "phishing" is said to have been coined by the well known spammer and hacker in the mid-90s, Khan C. Smith. The first recorded mention of the term is found in the hacking tool AOHell (according to its creator), which included a function for attempting to steal the passwords or financial details of America Online users.
 1995
 Phishing on AOL was a technique used by the warez community, who traded in unlicensed software, and black hat hackers to steal credit card information and commit other online crimes. AOL would suspend the accounts of individuals caught using certain keywords in chat rooms related to counterfeiting software or stolen accounts. The term "phishing" originated from the use of the <>< symbol in chat transcripts as a way to disguise references to illegal activity and evade detection by AOL staff. The symbol resembled a fish, and, combined with the popularity of phreaking, led to the term "phishing." AOHell, a program released in 1995, allowed hackers to impersonate AOL staff and send instant messages to victims asking them to reveal their passwords by claiming to need to "verify your account" or "confirm billing information". AOHell was a custom-written program used for phishing and warezing on AOL. In an effort to combat phishing, AOL added a warning to all instant messages stating that they would never ask for passwords or billing information. However, users with both AOL and non-AOL internet accounts (such as those from an ISP) could still phish AOL members without consequences. In 1995, AOL implemented measures to prevent the use of fake credit card numbers to open accounts, leading to an increase in phishing for legitimate accounts. AOL deactivated accounts involved in phishing, and eventually the warez scene on AOL was shut down, causing most phishers to leave the service.

2000s
 2001
 The first known direct attempt against a payment system affected E-gold in June 2001, which was followed up by a "post-9/11 id check" shortly after the September 11 attacks on the World Trade Center.
 2003
 The first known phishing attack against a retail bank was reported by The Banker in September 2003.
 2004
 Phishing is recognized as a fully organized part of the black market. Specializations emerged on a global scale that provided phishing software for payment (thereby outsourcing risk), which were assembled and implemented into phishing campaigns by organized gangs.
 2005
 2006
 Almost half of phishing thefts in 2006 were committed by groups operating through the Russian Business Network based in St. Petersburg.
 Banks dispute with customers over phishing losses. The stance adopted by the UK banking body APACS is that "customers must also take sensible precautions ... so that they are not vulnerable to the criminal." Similarly, when the first spate of phishing attacks hit the Irish Republic's banking sector in September 2006, the Bank of Ireland initially refused to cover losses suffered by its customers, although losses to the tune of €113,000 were made good.
 Phishers are targeting the customers of banks and online payment services. Emails, supposedly from the Internal Revenue Service, have been used to glean sensitive data from U.S. taxpayers. While the first such examples were sent indiscriminately in the expectation that some would be received by customers of a given bank or service, recent research has shown that phishers may in principle be able to determine which banks potential victims use, and target bogus emails accordingly.
 Social networking sites are a prime target of phishing, since the personal details in such sites can be used in identity theft; in late 2006 a computer worm took over pages on MySpace and altered links to direct surfers to websites designed to steal login details.
 2007
 3.6 million adults lost  in the 12 months ending in August 2007.
 Attackers who broke into TD Ameritrade's database and took 6.3 million email addresses (though they were not able to obtain social security numbers, account numbers, names, addresses, dates of birth, phone numbers and trading activity) also wanted the account usernames and passwords, so they launched a follow-up spear phishing attack.
 2008
 The RapidShare file sharing site has been targeted by phishing to obtain a premium account, which removes speed caps on downloads, auto-removal of uploads, waits on downloads, and cool down times between uploads.
 Cryptocurrencies such as Bitcoin facilitate the sale of malicious software, making transactions secure and anonymous.
 2009
 In January 2009, a phishing attack resulted in unauthorized wire transfers of US$1.9 million through Experi-Metal's online banking accounts.
 In the third quarter of 2009, the Anti-Phishing Working Group reported receiving 115,370 phishing email reports from consumers with US and China hosting more than 25% of the phishing pages each.

2010s

 2011
 In March 2011, Internal RSA staff were successfully phished, leading to the master keys for all RSA SecureID security tokens being stolen, then subsequently used to break into US defense suppliers.
 Chinese phishing campaigns targeted Gmail accounts of highly ranked officials of the United States and South Korean governments and militaries, as well as Chinese political activists.
 2012
 According to Ghosh, there were "445,004 attacks in 2012 as compared to 258,461 in 2011 and 187,203 in 2010".
 2013
 In August 2013, advertising service Outbrain suffered a spear-phishing attack and SEA placed redirects into the websites of The Washington Post, Time, and CNN.
 In October 2013, emails purporting to be from American Express were sent to an unknown number of recipients.
 In November 2013, 110 million customer and credit card records were stolen from Target customers, through a phished subcontractor account. CEO and IT security staff subsequently fired.
 By December 2013, Cryptolocker ransomware had infected 250,000 computers. According to Dell SecureWorks, 0.4% or more of those infected likely agreed to the ransom demand.
 2014
 In January 2014, the Seculert Research Lab identified a new targeted attack that used Xtreme RAT. This attack used spear phishing emails to target Israeli organizations and deploy the piece of advanced malware. Fifteen machines were compromised including ones belonging to the Civil Administration of Judea and Samaria.
 In August 2014, the iCloud leaks of celebrity photos was found to be based on phishing e-mails sent to the victims that looked like they came from Apple or Google, warning the victims that their accounts might be compromised and asking for their account details.
 In November 2014, phishing attacks on ICANN gained administrative access to the Centralized Zone Data System; also gained was data about users in the system – and access to ICANN's public Governmental Advisory Committee wiki, blog, and whois information portal.
 2015
 Charles H. Eccleston pleaded guilty in an attempted spear-phishing when he attempted to infect computers of 80 Department of Energy employees.
 Eliot Higgins and other journalists associated with Bellingcat, a group researching the shootdown of Malaysia Airlines Flight 17 over Ukraine, were targeted by numerous spear phishing emails.
 In August 2015, Cozy Bear was linked to a spear-phishing cyber-attack against the Pentagon email system causing the shut down of the entire Joint Staff unclassified email system and Internet access during the investigation.
 In August 2015, Fancy Bear used a zero-day exploit of Java, in a spear phishing attack spoofing the Electronic Frontier Foundation and launching attacks on the White House and NATO.
 2016
 In February, Austrian aerospace firm FACC AG was defrauded of 42 million euros ($47 million) through a BEC attack – and subsequently fired both the CFO and CEO.
 Fancy Bear carried out spear phishing attacks on email addresses associated with the Democratic National Committee in the first quarter of 2016.
 The Wichita Eagle reported "KU employees fall victim to phishing scam, lose paychecks"
 Fancy Bear is suspected to be behind a spear phishing attack in August 2016 on members of the Bundestag and multiple political parties such as Linken-faction leader Sahra Wagenknecht, Junge Union and the CDU of Saarland.
 In August 2016, the World Anti-Doping Agency reported the receipt of phishing emails sent to users of its database claiming to be official WADA, but consistent with the Russian hacking group Fancy Bear. According to WADA, some of the data the hackers released had been forged.
 Within hours of the 2016 U.S. election results, Russian hackers sent emails from spoofed Harvard University email addresses, using techniques similar to phishing to publish fake news targeted at ordinary American voters.
 2017
 In 2017, 76% of organizations experienced phishing attacks. Nearly half of information security professionals surveyed said that the rate of attacks increased from 2016.
 In the first half of 2017 businesses and residents of Qatar were hit with more than 93,570 phishing events in a three-month span.
 A phishing email to Google and Facebook users successfully induced employees into wiring money – to the extent of US$100 million – to overseas bank accounts under the control of a hacker. He has since been arrested by the US Department of Justice.
 In August 2017, customers of Amazon faced the Amazon Prime Day phishing attack, when hackers sent out seemingly legitimate deals to customers of Amazon. When Amazon's customers attempted to make purchases using the "deals", the transaction would not be completed, prompting the retailer's customers to input data that could be compromised and stolen.
 2018
 In 2018, the company block.one, which developed the EOS.IO blockchain, was attacked by a phishing group who sent phishing emails to all customers, aimed at intercepting the user's cryptocurrency wallet key; and a later attack targeted airdrop tokens.
 2019
 Between May 30, 2019, and October 6, 2019, an unauthorized individual gained access to employee email accounts at Golden Entertainment, a Las Vegas, Nevada slot machine operator using an email phishing attack. The attacker had access to one particular email with an attachment containing the Social Security Numbers, Passport numbers, government IDs, and various personal data of multiple company employees and vendors. It is unclear whether this information was exposed. The company notified all affected individuals as a precaution, offering them complimentary Credit report monitoring. Subsequently, a class action lawsuit against the company was approved in the United States District Court for the District of Nevada on December 17, 2020.
 From 2015 to 2019, Unatrac Holding Ltd. was subjected to an ongoing spear phishing attack, costing about US$11 million. Obinwanne Okeke and conspirators first acquired the company CFO's email credentials. Then, they sent fake invoices and wire transfer requests to the company's financial department. Okeke perpetrated cyberfraud against many other businesses and individuals, successfully capturing email and other sensitive login credentials. On February 16, 2021, he was sentenced to 10 years in prison.

2020s
 2020
 On July 15, 2020, Twitter suffered a breach that combined elements of Social engineering (security) and phishing. A 17-year-old hacker and accomplices setup a fake website resembling Twitter's internal VPN provider used by remote working employees. Individuals posing as helpdesk staff called multiple Twitter employees, directing them to submit their credentials to the fake VPN website. Using the details supplied by the unknowing employees, they were then able to seize control of several high-profile user accounts, including Barack Obama, Elon Musk, Joe Biden and Apple Inc.'s company account. The hackers sent messages to Twitter followers soliciting Bitcoin promising double the transaction value in return, collecting 12.86 BTC (about $117,000 at the time).

Overview

References

Spamming 
Internet terminology 
Organized crime activity 
Social engineering (computer security) 
Cybercrime 
Confidence tricks 
Identity theft 
Types of cyberattacks 
Deception 
Fraud